KVPM (95.7 FM) is a radio station licensed to Arvin, California and serves the Bakersfield area. Its broadcast license is held by SHEMOGUL Media, LLC.

History
This station received its original construction permit from the Federal Communications Commission on November 6, 2015. The new station was assigned the KKCA call sign by the FCC on November 21, 2015. KKCA received its license to cover from the FCC on December 31, 2018. The station had a country format until 2021.

The call letters were changed to KVPM on June 21, 2021, after the station was acquired from Colt Comm, LLC by SHEMOGUL Media, LLC. A previous 2019 sale to American General Media failed to close. After SHEMOGUL Media, LLC was acquired, KVPM switched from country to urban contemporary.

References

External links

VPM
Radio stations established in 2018
2018 establishments in California